Moog Indigo is the ninth studio album by the French electronic music pioneer Jean-Jacques Perrey, released in 1970 on the Vanguard Records label. The name album is a reference to Jazz song "Mood Indigo" by Duke Ellington.

Composition and recording 
In 1963 Perrey with the American guitarist Vinnie Bell did a session for Kai Winding, in which Perrey played the Ondioline and Bell played the guitar. After that Vinnie along with Perrey recorded several successful commercials and when Jean-Jacques got a contract with the Vanguard Records label. Perrey asked him to be the lead guitarist for his recording sessions as "Soul City" and "E.V.A.". The latter is a tribute to the first man to walk on the moon, Neil Armstrong.

Perrey's version of "Flight of the Bumblebee" composed by Russian composer Rimsky Korsakov, uses real bee sounds. Perrey stated how he made this version to the Computer Music Journal magazine:

For this composition, I took a Nagra tape recorder to an apiary in Switzerland to record the live sounds of bees buzzing about their hive. I took these bee tapes back to New York, where my studio had a variable-speed tape recorder. Using this machine, I transposed the bee buzzes to the subdivisions of the 12-tone equal-tempered scale and rerecorded them on another tape machine. Then, using manual splicing techniques, I edited the melody for one verse. Just this part took 52 hours of splicing work. People told me that I was crazy, but I told them to listen to the result! We added an accompaniment to the melody, recreating the "Flight of the Bumblebee" played by living bees.

"Gossipo Perpetuo" versioned Moto Perpetuo written by the Italian violinist and composer Niccolo Paganini and also used "stuttering vocal samples" and "various Moog settings soaring up and down the scale while congas and shuffling drums hit a samba beat." "The Elephant Never Forgets" is a Perrey's adaptation of "Turkish March" composed by German composer Ludwig van Beethoven. His middle part was arranged by American composer Harry Breuer. "18Th Century Puppet" shows clear nods to the baroque composition, and "Hello, Dolly!" by Jerry Herman was versioned.

Release 
Moog Indigo was released on Vanguard Records label in 1970, being Perrey's fourth and final studio album to be released on that label. The album was followed by the single "Passport to the Future", which reached No. 20 on the Adult Contemporary (known at the time as Easy Listening) and No. 106 on the Billboard Hot 100. The song also reached #94 in the Cashbox Singles chart. In 1997 when Fatboy Slim remixed the track "E.V.A.", it was released as single on 15 February, peaked at #79 in British charts and also had a music video. In 2017, Moog Indigo was reissued in a 180 gram 12-inch-Vinyl format by Vanguard label.

Critical reception 

Retrospective reviews of the album have been generally favorable. Alan Ranta from Exclaim! magazine declared that "are countless creative opportunities to be found in this half-hour trip that have yet to be fully explored, and for the rest of us, it's an opportunity to experience a landmark album of electronic pop that stands the test of time." Robert Ham of Paste magazine stated that "what keeps these records in circulation is the humor that artists like Perrey brought into the mix and how the sounds and spirit found within the grooves call to mind an era when the skies suddenly felt limitless."

The Musoscribe website commented that Perrey's work should not be taken in the same context as other pioneers of electronic music such as Jean-Michel Jarre or Hans-Joachim Roedelius since: "His work wasn't as edgy and experimental as that of those other guys." He also felt that it "is a collection of incredibly catchy tunes, delivered in the funnest way imaginable." A retrospective review by AllMusic reviewer Donald A. Guarisco describing the album as "a solid choice for fans of the room with a sense of humor". Moog Indigo was ranked as the 66th best album of 1970 by uDiscover Music. The Album of the Year website gave it an average score of 75 based on AllMusic and Exclaim! reviews.

Legacy 
"E.V.A." was sampled numerous times by hip-hop and rap artists. Notable examples include "Just To Get A Rep" by Gang Starr (1990), "Lower da Boom" by Artifacts (1994), "Gameplan" by Lord Finesse (1995), "3000" by Dr.Octagon (1996), "Same Ol'Thing" by A Tribe Called Quest (1997), "Lunch Money" by Pusha T (2014), and "Every Little Thing I Do" by Jamila Woods and Taylor Bennett (2017).

In 2004, "E.V.A." featured in a Zelnorm commercial and in an 2016 Apple advertising campaign "Shot on iPhone". For years, his music was used in different entertainment media; "E.V.A." appeared in the 2018 film, Ocean's 8. Mexican comedian Roberto Gomez Bolaños (most known professionally as Chespirito) used some Moog Indigo pieces for his television series: "Country Rock Polka" was used in his namesake series, and "The Elephant Never Forgets" was used as the theme song for the series El Chavo del 8. The latter also was the main theme of the Canadian TV program The Buck Shot Show.

Track listing
Side A

Side B

References

External links 
Moog Indigo at Discogs

1970 albums
Jean-Jacques Perrey albums
Vanguard Records albums